"Message in a Bottle" is a song by English rock band the Police. It was released as the lead single from their second studio album, Reggatta de Blanc (1979). Written by the band's lead singer and bassist Sting, the song is ostensibly about a story of a castaway on an island, who sends out a message in a bottle to seek love. A year later, he has not received any sort of response, and despairs, thinking he is destined to be alone. The next day, he sees "a hundred billion bottles" on the shore, finding out that there are more people like him out there. Over the course of the song, Sting mentions sending an S.O.S. 31 times.

The song was the first of their five UK number one singles. Rolling Stone ranked it number 65 on its list of the "100 Greatest Guitar Songs of All Time".

Composition
The song exemplifies the reggae rock/new wave style of early Police. It is composed in the key of C minor with a chord progression of C#m9–Amaj9–B7–F#m.

According to the band's guitarist, Andy Summers, Sting had initially intended the guitar riff that "Message in a Bottle" is centred around for a different song. Summers said to L'Historia Bandidio in 1981: "Sting had that riff for a while, but there was another tune with it originally. He'd been fiddling about with it during our first American tour. Finally, he rearranged the riff slightly and came up with the song." Summers came up with, as Sting described, "lovely arpeggiated shiver" during the break prior to the third verse. Sting praised this addition saying, "He'd [Summers] do that – the song would be quite raw and he'd just add these lovely colours." The riff in its final form is built of multiple overdubbed guitar parts, played by Summers. Following the main progression of the song, one part features Summers playing a three note figure featuring the root, fifth, and ninth of each chord in succession. A second guitar part plays the identical rhythm with different harmony notes, adding minor or major thirds to each chord, as well as additional extensions such as eleventh and thirteenth notes.

The song was recorded at Surrey Sound Studios as part of the sessions for the Reggatta de Blanc album. Stewart Copeland's drumming, praised as his "finest drum track" by Summers, was "overdubbed [from] about six different parts."

Cash Box described the song's hook as "a mesmerizing guitar figure" that is similar to that of Blue Öyster Cult's "Don't Fear the Reaper." Record World said that "Sharp tempo contrasts are bridged by Andy Summers' hard-edged lead guitar while singer-songwriter Sting pleads an affecting lead vocal."

The theme of the song is "universality of desired connection." The lyrics depict a castaway longing for someone to listen to him and then discovered many messages from others washing up on his shore.

The song's B-side, "Landlord", was written by Sting (lyrics) and Copeland (music). Sting said of its inspiration, "I wrote that after Frances and I were thrown out of the house we were renting in London. I hated the idea of somebody fucking my life up like that. Stewart [Copeland] wrote the music." The song originally featured lyrics by Copeland, but they were replaced by Sting's.

Live performances
The Police debuted the song on live television on the BBC's Rock Goes to College, filmed at Hatfield Polytechnic College in Hertfordshire, England. The Police donated all money earned from the show to the college.

The Police performed at Live Earth, a 2007 charity concert to raise awareness of global warming and other environmental hazards, and performed "Message in a Bottle" as the US finale, with John Mayer playing guitar with Andy Summers and Kanye West performing a rap verse over the chorus of the song.

Reception
The song was released as the first single from Reggatta de Blanc in September 1979. The song was a massive success in Britain, becoming the Police's first  hit in the UK Singles Chart. The song also topped the charts in Ireland and reached  in Australia. Despite its popularity in the UK, the single only reached  in the United States. Even though it only reached No. 74 in the United States, it is widely popular contemporarily and is still played on radio stations. An alternative "classic rock" mix is available on Every Breath You Take: The Classics.

"Message in a Bottle" is also a personal favourite of the members of the band. In addition to saying it was his favourite song in an interview with Jools Holland of the BBC, Sting described it as a "good song", and also said that he was "very proud" of it. Copeland said it was "one of our best moments in the studio and always great on stage." Summers described the track as a personal favourite in his book One Train Later, and said, "For me, it's still the best song Sting ever came up with and the best Police track."

According to Billboard, "Message in a Bottle" has an "irresistible" hook.  Ultimate Classic Rock critic Mike Duquette rated it as the Police's best song, praising the "foolishly simple guitar riff devised by Sting but played to perfection by Summers" the "cacophony of percussive brilliance by Copeland" and "Sting’s most plainspoken and razor-sharp lyric."

Personnel
The album credits simply state: "All noises by the Police. All arrangements by the Police." On Tidal, the credits are given as the following:
 Sting – bass guitar, vocals, songwriting
 Stewart Copeland – drums, percussion
 Andy Summers – guitar

Track listing
A&M / AMS 7474
 "Message in a Bottle" (edit) – 3:50 (This edit has yet to appear on CD anywhere)
 "Landlord" – 3:09

Chart performance

Weekly charts

Year-end charts

Decade-end charts

Certifications

Covers
American rock band American Hi-Fi performed a cover of the song for the 2003 film Rugrats Go Wild.
On 14 April 2020, Sting recorded a duet cover of "Message in a Bottle" with the quartet All Saints.

References

External links
 

The Police songs
1979 singles
Songs written by Sting (musician)
1979 songs
Song recordings produced by Nigel Gray
A&M Records singles
Irish Singles Chart number-one singles
Number-one singles in Spain
UK Singles Chart number-one singles
Songs about loneliness
Songs about letters (message)